Sobieski is a city in Morrison County, Minnesota, United States. The population was 210 at the 2020 census.

History
Sobieski was named after Polish Hero King John III Sobieski.

The House of Sobieski was a noble family with a prominent role in Polish history, and the choice of name reflects the large Polish American element in the town's population.

SOBIESKI, a city in sections 3-9 of Swan River Township, was incorporated as a village on December 2, 1915, and separated from the township on June 10, 1920. It was developed on the site of earlier communities; the first was a post office in section 4, 1875–1904, called Ledoux for Frank X. Ledoux, who owned a store and was first postmaster; the community was then called Swan River, although that post office, 1854–79, was established in Benton County, the name continuing until 1918 when changed to Sobieski for Prince Sobieski, hero of Poland; Swan River was also known as Green's Ferry and Aitkinsville, the latter because William A. Aitkin, the fur trader for whom Aitkin County was named, is buried there.

Courtesy Minnesota Historical Society

From what can be gathered, as many of the local people are of Kashubian-Polish Heritage, the naming of the community for Jan Sobieski is fitting for his association with the Kashubian Polish Hussars in defeating the Ottomans.

Geography

Demographics

2010 census
As of the census of 2010, there were 195 people, 87 households, and 51 families living in the city. The racial makeup of the city was 100.0% White.

There were 87 households, of which 23.0% had children under the age of 18 living with them, 48.3% were married couples living together, 3.4% had a female householder with no husband present, 6.9% had a male householder with no wife present, and 41.4% were non-families. 32.2% of all households were made up of individuals, and 12.6% had someone living alone who was 65 years of age or older. The average household size was 2.24 and the average family size was 2.88.

The median age in the city was 43.5 years. 23.1% of residents were under the age of 18; 3.1% were between the ages of 18 and 24; 25.6% were from 25 to 44; 33.8% were from 45 to 64; and 14.4% were 65 years of age or older. The gender makeup of the city was 52.3% male and 47.7% female.

2000 census
As of the census of 2000, there were 196 people, 87 households, and 54 families living in the city. There were 88 housing units at an average density of 21.0 per square mile (8.1/km). The racial makeup of the city was 99.49% White and 0.51% Native American.

There were 87 households, out of which 23.0% had children under the age of 18 living with them, 50.6% were married couples living together, 8.0% had a female householder with no husband present, and 36.8% were non-families. 32.2% of all households were made up of individuals, and 16.1% had someone living alone who was 65 years of age or older.  The average household size was 2.25 and the average family size was 2.82.

In the city, the population was spread out, with 21.4% under the age of 18, 9.7% from 18 to 24, 27.6% from 25 to 44, 22.4% from 45 to 64, and 18.9% who were 65 years of age or older.  The median age was 42 years. For every 100 females, there were 104.2 males.  For every 100 females age 18 and over, there were 108.1 males.

Economy
The median income for a household in the city was $30,625, and the median income for a family was $36,250. Males had a median income of $30,313 versus $20,000 for females. The per capita income for the city was $14,344.  About 10.0% of families and 19.1% of the population were below the poverty line, including 14.3% of those under the age of eighteen and 27.9% of those 65 or over.

References

Cities in Morrison County, Minnesota
Cities in Minnesota
Polish-American culture in Minnesota